Gary R. Chiusano (born August 5, 1951) is an American Republican Party politician, who served in the New Jersey General Assembly from January 8, 2008 until February 11, 2013, where he represented the 24th Legislative District.  He resigned on February 11, 2013, from the New Jersey General Assembly to become the Sussex County Surrogate. Chiusano served in the Assembly on the Commerce and Economic Development Committee and the Financial Institutions and Insurance Committee. He served on the Frankford Township Committee from 2001-2003 as Mayor of Frankford Township, New Jersey and on the Sussex County Board of County Commissioners from 2003 to 2008. Chiusano graduated with a B.S. degree from Drexel University with a major in Business Administration and Finance. He is a resident of Augusta, within Frankford Township, New Jersey.

References

External links 
Assemblyman Chiusano's legislative webpage, New Jersey Legislature
New Jersey Legislature financial disclosure forms
2011 2010 2009 2008 2007 
Gary Chiusano, Assembly Republicans

1951 births
Living people
Drexel University alumni
Mayors of places in New Jersey
County commissioners in New Jersey
Republican Party members of the New Jersey General Assembly
Politicians from Sussex County, New Jersey
21st-century American politicians